Syntrita is a genus of moths of the family Crambidae described by Paul Dognin in 1905.

Species
Syntrita fulviferalis (Dognin, 1912)
Syntrita leucochasma (Hampson, 1912)
Syntrita monostigmatalis (Dognin, 1912)
Syntrita nimalis (Schaus, 1924)
Syntrita prosalis (Druce, 1895)
Syntrita umbralis Dognin, 1905

References

Spilomelinae
Crambidae genera
Taxa named by Paul Dognin